is a female Japanese light novelist from Tokyo, Japan. In 2001, Arisawa won the silver prize in the eighth installment of MediaWorks' Dengeki Novel Prize with her work Infinity Zero. Following this, the novel was published by MediaWorks under their Dengeki Bunko label, and three other volumes in the series were subsequently published. Following the end of Infinity Zero, Arisawa began work on Inukami! in April 2002 until the release of Inukami!'s last volume in September 2007. In December 2007, Arisawa began to write a new series entitled Lucky Chance!.

Works
Infinity Zero series
Infinity Zero Fuyu: White Snow
Infinity Zero (2) Haru: White Blossom
Infinity Zero (3) Natsu: White Moon
Infinity Zero (4) Aki: Darkness Pure

Inukami! series
Inukami!
Inukami! 2
Inukami! 3
Inukami! 4
Inukami! 5
Inukami! 6
Inukami! 7
Inukami! 8: Kawahira-ke no Ichiban Nagai Ichinichi
Inukami! 9: Happy Hop Step Jump!
Inukami! 10
Inukami! 11
Inukami! 12
Inukami! 13 Kanketsuhen (part 1): Hop Step Dash
Inukami! 14 Kanketsuhen (part 2): Fly High High
Inukami! EX Wan!
Inukami! Special Edition

Lucky Chance! series
Lucky Chance!
Lucky Chance! 2

The World God Only Knows series
The World God Only Knows 1: God and the Demon and an Angel

External links
Mamizu Arisawa's personal website 

Light novelists
Writers from Tokyo
Living people
Year of birth missing (living people)